Ziemięcice  is a village in the administrative district of Gmina Zbrosławice, within Tarnowskie Góry County, Silesian Voivodeship, in southern Poland.

The village has a population of 925.

References

Villages in Tarnowskie Góry County